Warabi can have several meanings, including:
Warabi, Saitama, a Japanese city
Monjon, a type of rock-wallaby also called "warabi"
Bracken (warabi), Japanese bracken fern
Warabimochi, a wagashi traditionally made from warabi and served with kinako and kuromitsu
Warabi, a Momi-class destroyer commissioned in 1921 and lost in collision with the light cruiser Jintsū off Cape Miho in 1927